British Tar was probably launched in Spain, though possibly in the United States, in 1793. She appears to have come into British hands as a prize in 1802, but she does not appear in the British registers until 1804. In January 1806 British Tar, W. White, master, Pinson & Co., owner, was on a voyage from Labrador in British North America to a Mediterranean port during the War of the Third Coalition when a French Navy squadron captured and burned her in the Mediterranean Sea.

Citations 

1793 ships
Ships built in Spain
Ships built in the United States
Age of Sail merchant ships of England
Captured ships
Maritime incidents in 1806
Ship fires
Scuttled vessels
Shipwrecks in the Mediterranean Sea